The 2004 United States House of Representatives elections in Texas occurred on November 2, 2004, to elect the members of the state of Texas's delegation to the United States House of Representatives. Texas had thirty-two seats in the House, apportioned according to the 2000 United States Census.

These elections occurred simultaneously with the United States Senate elections of 2004, the United States House elections in other states, and various state and local elections.

Republicans gained five of Texas's House seats due to a midterm redistricting in 2003. However some of the districts created following this election would later be changed. The Twenty-third district would be declared an unconstitutional racially gerrymandered district by the Supreme Court in League of United Latin American Citizens v. Perry in 2006. Thus it and neighboring districts would be redrawn.

Overview

Congressional Districts

District 1 
Incumbent Democrat Max Sandlin ran for re-election.

District 2 
Incumbent Democrat Jim Turner opted to retire rather than run for re-election. Democratic representative Nick Lampson was redistricted from the neighboring 9th District and ran for re-election here.

District 3 
Incumbent Republican Sam Johnson ran for re-election.

District 4 
Incumbent Democrat Ralph Hall switched his party affiliation to the Republican Party on January 3, 2004. He ran for re-election.

District 5 
Incumbent Republican Jeb Hensarling ran for re-election.

District 6 
Incumbent Republican Joe Barton ran for re-election.

District 7 
Incumbent Republican John Culberson ran for re-election.

District 8 
Incumbent Republican Kevin Brady ran for re-election.

District 9 
Incumbent Democrat Nick Lampson was redistricted to the 2nd District. He ran for re-election there. Democratic representative Chris Bell was redistricted from the neighboring 25th District and also ran for re-election here, but he lost in the primary to Al Green.

District 10 
Incumbent Democrat Lloyd Doggett was redistricted to the 25th District. He ran for re-election there.

District 11 
Incumbent Democrat Chet Edwards was redistricted to the 17th District. He ran for re-election there.

District 12 
Incumbent Republican Kay Granger ran for re-election.

District 13 
Incumbent Republican Mac Thornberry ran for re-election.

District 14 
Incumbent Republican Ron Paul ran for re-election unopposed.

District 15 
Incumbent Democrat Ruben Hinojosa ran for re-election.

District 16 
Incumbent Democrat Silvestre Reyes ran for re-election.

District 17 
Incumbent Democrat Charles Stenholm was redistricted to the 19th District. Democratic representative Chet Edwards was redistricted from the neighboring 11th District and ran for re-election here.

District 18 
Incumbent Democrat Sheila Jackson Lee ran for re-election.

District 19 
A week after winning re-election in 2002, incumbent Republican Larry Combest announced that he would resign on May 31, 2003. This prompted a special election to be held, which fellow Republican Randy Neugebauer won in a runoff. He ran for re-election. Democratic representative Charles Stenholm was redistricted from the neighboring 17th District and also ran for re-election here.

District 20 
Incumbent Democrat Charlie Gonzalez ran for re-election.

District 21 
Incumbent Republican Lamar Smith ran for re-election.

District 22 
Incumbent Republican Tom DeLay ran for re-election.

District 23 
Incumbent Republican Henry Bonilla ran for re-election.

District 24 
Incumbent Democrat Martin Frost was redistricted to the 32nd District. He ran for re-election there.

District 25 
Incumbent Democrat Chris Bell was redistricted to the 9th District. He ran for re-election there but lost in the primary to Al Green. Democratic representative Lloyd Doggett was redistricted from the neighboring 10th District and ran for re-election here.

District 26 
Incumbent Republican Michael Burgess ran for re-election.

District 27 
Incumbent Democrat Solomon Ortiz ran for re-election.

District 28 
Incumbent Democrat Ciro Rodriguez ran for re-election but lost in the primary to Henry Cuellar.

District 29 
Incumbent Democrat Gene Green ran for re-election.

District 30 
Incumbent Democrat Eddie Bernice Johnson ran for re-election.

District 31 
Incumbent Republican John Carter ran for re-election.

District 32 
Incumbent Republican Pete Sessions ran for re-election. Democratic representative Martin Frost was redistricted from the neighboring 24th District and also ran for re-election here.

See also 
 2004 United States House of Representatives elections

References

Texas
2004
United States House of Representatives